The Texas State Guard (TXSG) is part of the state military force of Texas, and one of three branches of the Texas Military Forces. Along with the other two branches, the TXSG falls under the command of the Governor of Texas and is administered by the Adjutant General of Texas, an appointee of the Governor. The other two branches of the Texas Military Forces are the Texas Army National Guard and the Texas Air National Guard.

The mission of the Texas State Guard (TXSG) is to provide mission-ready military forces to assist state and local authorities in times of state emergencies, to conduct homeland security and mission support activities under the umbrella of Defense Support to Civil Authorities, and to augment the Texas Army National Guard and Texas Air National Guard as required.

Headquartered at Camp Mabry in Austin, Texas, the TXSG functions as an organized state military under the authority of Title 32 of the U.S. Code and Chapter 431 of the Texas Government Code. The Governor of Texas has sole control over the Texas State Guard, because it is not subject to federal activation.

Structure

The Texas State Guard is a state defense force that assists and augments the other Texas military branches and civil authorities in times of state emergencies, and on-going support of National Guard units and local communities. They are not part of the federal armed forces command structure, but rather operate purely as a state-organized and controlled military force.

The Texas State Guard consists of four Civil Affairs Brigades, as well as a Maritime Brigade, Medical Brigade, and an Air Division.

Guardsmen's entry rank depends on prior federal military service and/or civilian education. Individuals with no prior military service or ROTC training must attend the Basic Orientation Training (BOT) course.

Texas State Guard personnel actively support the state in the event of catastrophic events, and ongoing state military missions. Guardsmen receive duty pay [currently $151 daily, regardless of rank] when activated by the Governor and placed on paid state active duty, and starting in 2008, for a limited number of mandatory training days.

The organizational structure follows the federal military component structure, with comparable positions, ranks, protocols, and authorities. Guardsmen wear the Texas military uniform according to a branch of service (in accordance with branch regulations) in regards to state military forces when conducting activities while on duty. TXSG personnel are also eligible for the same State issued military awards and decorations as members of the Texas Army & Air National Guard. For example, deployed members of the Texas State Guard received the Governor's Unit Citation for Hurricane Katrina and Rita relief in 2005.

The governor is the commander in chief of the Texas State Guard. Article 4, Section 7 of the Texas Constitution states that "He shall be Commander-in-Chief of the military forces of the State, except when they are called into actual service of the United States. He shall have the power to call forth the militia to execute the laws of the State, to suppress insurrections, and to repel invasions."

Command

The Commanding General of the State Guard is Brigadier General Anthony Woods. The Senior Enlisted Advisor is Command Sergeant Major Harlan Thompson.

History

The Texas State Guard has its roots in Stephen F. Austin's colonial militia. On February 18, 1823, Emperor of Mexico, Agustín de Iturbide, authorized Austin who was the leader of the first non-Spanish efforts of Texas settlement "to organize the colonists into a body of the national militia, to preserve tranquility." Austin was appointed to the rank of lieutenant colonel and allowed the colonists to elect all subordinate militia officers. Soon after, Austin's militia was authorized to make war on Indian tribes who were hostile and molested the settlement. In 1827, in a move contrary to modern perceptions of Anglo-Texan colonists in Mexico, Austin's militia mobilized in support of the Mexican government to put down the Fredonian Rebellion, a group of Americans who tried to declare a part of Texas as an independent republic separate from Mexico.

In 1835, all of the local militias in Texas were annexed by Sam Houston to provide a unified military command for the provisional government of the Republic of Texas. After becoming an independent republic in 1836, these forces were aligned with the Army of the Republic of Texas. In 1845, with the annexation of Texas by the United States, this structure was supplanted by the United States Army, but local militia companies were maintained for a ready response. After secession from the United States in 1861, existing militia companies rallied and new militia regiments were formed which were made available to the various armies of the Confederacy.

It was officially reorganized as the "State Guard" in 1871 during Reconstruction to unify the independent militia companies and regiments throughout the state and continued in operation until 1903, when it was replaced by the nationalized Texas Army National Guard. It was revived in 1941, after thousands of Texan troops were deployed overseas in World War II, to provide state military forces and support for wartime civil defense.

When the National Guard was mobilized for service in the First World War, the federal legislature recognized the need for state troops to replace the National Guard. A law was passed authorizing the formation of home defense forces for the duration of the war. While Texas passed the necessary enabling statutes, it did not form such an organization. As World War II made mobilization of the National Guard again likely, steps were taken to provide for state troops as replacements for the National Guard. The Texas Legislature passed the Defense Act, HB 45, and the Governor signed the bill on 10 February 1941. This time, a force was organized, with the task falling to Brigadier General J. Watt Page, the Adjutant General of Texas. Within a year, the Texas Defense Guard numbered 17,497 officers and enlisted men. This number was in sharp contrast to the 11,633 members of the Texas National Guard mustered into federal service some months before. The Texas Defense Guard was organized into fifty independent battalions, each composed of a varying number of companies and a headquarters.

The federal legislation authorizing them expired on 25 July 1947. This was not taken lightly in some states and most notably in Texas. In that same year, the State Legislature authorized the Texas State Guard Reserve Corps. It was activated in January, 1948. The Reserve Corps continued in existence until ten years after the Congress had once again authorized state guards in 1955. Under statutes enacted by the 59th Legislature, the Texas State Guard Reserve Corps was abolished and Texas State Guard was again authorized and organized on 30 August 1965.

First made up of independent battalions, it was later organized along regimental lines, and at one time also included brigade-sized elements. It was first organized as Infantry and "Internal Security" units. After the early 1970s, it was organized as Military Police with companies assigned to battalions for control and the battalions, in turn, assigned to groups. For several years, there were six Military Police Groups with boundaries generally following those of Texas Department of Public Safety command districts. 
 
In 1979, the 7th Military Police Group was formed to provide for command and control over remaining separate battalions in East Texas. A reorganization in 1980 resulted in the formation of the 8th and 9th Military Police Groups in San Antonio and Dallas. The original six groups were headquartered in Fort Worth, Houston, the Rio Grande Valley, Midland, Lubbock, and Austin.

In 1993, Texas State Guard was reorganized into regiments and the old group designations disappeared. Regimental headquarters were established in San Antonio (1st), Austin (2nd), Fort Worth (4th), Houston (8th), Dallas (19th), and Lubbock (39th). In ceremonies held in Killeen in July 1993, during the Texas State Guard Association convention, the newly organized regiments were presented with their new colors by the incumbent general officers and three retired general officers of the Texas State Guard. For the first time since World War II, the regiments were authorized distinctive unit insignia for wear by assigned personnel. In March, 1995, a seventh regiment, the 9th, was organized in El Paso from elements of the 39th. This added regiment did not survive though and personnel were returned to the 39th in 1999.

Legal protection
Employers in the state of Texas are required under Texas law to provide a leave of absence to any employees who are members of the Texas State Guard (or any other state's military forces) whenever these employees are activated to take part in training, drill, or to take part in an emergency mission. Employers must reinstate these employees to their former employment positions following their deployments, without loss of time, efficiency rating, vacation time, or any benefit of employment during or because of the absence.

Recent operations

 Hurricane Laura in 2020
 Winter Weather response - 2019
 Hurricane Marco in 2020
 George Floyd Protests
 COVID-19 response
 Hurricane Harvey in 2017
 Operation Final Rest (Ongoing)
 Operation Lone Star (annual mission) 
 Operation Strong Safety (Ongoing)
 Operation Border Star I-VII (Ongoing)
 Observe Operation Jade Helm 15 in 2015 (see Jade Helm 15 conspiracy theories)
 Texas Memorial Day Flood (Blanco River) in 2015
 Bastrop Forest Fire in 2014
 Hurricane Alex in 2010
 Hurricane Ike in 2008
 Hurricane Gustav in 2008
Tropical Storm Edouard in 2008
 Hurricane Dolly in 2008
 Marble Falls Flood in 2007
 Hurricane Humberto in 2007
 Hurricane Dean in 2007
 Eagle Pass Tornado in 2007
 Operation Wrangler in 2007
 Hurricane Rita in 2005
 Hurricane Katrina in 2005
 Columbia Space Shuttle - ground search for remains in 2003

Awards

U.S. Armed Forces awards may be worn on the Texas State Guard uniform.
Texas Military Forces awards available to Texas State Guard members:

  Texas Medal of Valor
  Texas Purple Heart Medal
  Texas Superior Service Medal
  Texas Lone Star Distinguished Service Medal
  Texas Outstanding Service Medal
  Texas Medal of Merit (also awarded with "V" for valor)
  Texas Adjutant General's Individual Award
  Texas Humanitarian Service Ribbon
  Texas Homeland Defense Service Medal
  Texas Faithful Service Medal

Texas State Guard (TXSG) Awards:
  Texas State Guard Meritorious Service Ribbon
  Texas State Guard Commanding General's Individual Award Ribbon
  Texas State Guard Recruiting Ribbon
  Texas State Guard Officer Professional Development Ribbon
  Texas State Guard NCO Professional Development Ribbon
  Texas State Guard Enlisted Personnel Basic Training Ribbon
  Texas State Guard Physical Fitness Ribbon
  Texas State Guard 3 Year Service Medal

Texas State Guard Unit Awards:
  Texas Governor's Unit Citation
  Texas State Guard Meritorious Unit Award
  Texas State Guard Organizational Excellence Award

Commanding Generals

 Maj. Gen. J. Watt Page 1941-1943
 Maj. Gen. Arthur B. Knickerbocker 1943-1947
 Maj. Gen. Claude V. Birkhead 1947-1950
 Maj. Gen. Raymond Phelps 1950-1953
 Maj. Gen. Lloyd M. Bentsen Sr. 1953-1963
 Maj. Gen. John L. Thompson Jr. 1963-1966
 Maj. Gen. Harley B. West 1966-1969
 Maj. Gen. Max H. Specht 1969-1974
 Maj. Gen. William Green 1974-1984
 Maj. Gen. Roland Bruce Harris 1984-1987
 Maj. Gen. James W. Robinson 1988-1990
 Maj. Gen. Marlin E. Mote 1990-1994
 Maj. Gen. John H. Bailey, II 1994-1997
 Maj. Gen. Bertus L. Sisco 1997-2000
 Maj. Gen. Richard A. Box 2000-2006
 Maj. Gen. Christopher J. Powers 2006-2009
 Maj. Gen. Raymond C. Peters 2009-2012
 Maj. Gen. Manuel A. Rodriguez VII 2012-2014
 Maj. Gen. Gerald R. "Jake" Betty 2014-2017
 Maj. Gen. Robert J. "Duke" Bodisch 2017–2021
 Brig. Gen. Anthony Woods 2021–Present

In popular culture
The Texas State Guard was referenced in a Doonesbury comic strip in June 2015.

See also
Texas Wing Civil Air Patrol
State Guard Association of the United States

References

External links
 Texas State Guard

State Guard
State defense forces of the United States
Texas Military Department
1823 establishments in Texas